The following lists events that happened in 2015 in El Salvador.

Incumbents
President: Salvador Sánchez Cerén
Vice President: Óscar Ortiz

Events

March
The national murder rate was the worst in 10 years, with 481 people murdered following the collapse of a truce between rival gangs. Lauren Carasik, clinical professor of law and the director of the international human rights clinic at the Western New England University School of Law, warned that a pending US government aid proposal could increase the gang-related violence in the country.

May
The Central American Junior and Youth Championships in Athletics was held in San Salvador, at the Estadio Jorge "Mágico" González.

References

 
El Salvador
2010s in El Salvador
Years of the 21st century in El Salvador
El Salvador